Gresh is a surname. Notable people with the surname include:

 Alain Gresh (born 1948), French journalist
 Andy Gresh (born 1974), American sports broadcaster
 Dannah Gresh (born 1967), American public speaker
 Lois H. Gresh (21st century), American novelist
Gresh is the name of many fictional characters and may refer to:
 Gresh, an out of sale Bionicles Star kit and Character from the Bionicles TV Show